Port Discovery Children's Museum is a non-profit institution located in the historic Fish Market building in Baltimore, Maryland's Inner Harbor. It is 80,000 square feet and has three floors of exhibits and programs designed to be interactive and educational. It receives more than 265,000 visitors annually. The museum's focus is on children ages birth through 10 and their caregivers. 

The museum is served by the Baltimore Metro Subway's Shot Tower/Market Place station.

History
The original Baltimore Children's Museum was a Baltimore City agency founded in 1976 and was originally housed in The Cloisters, a historic property located in Baltimore County. The property and structure were donated to the City and the Museum operated out of this location for nearly 20 years. In 1990, the Baltimore Children's Museum formed its own 501(c)(3) non-profit corporation and merged with the Maryland Children's Museum. The merged entity's Board of Directors, along with Baltimore's Mayor Kurt Schmoke, decided to relocate the museum to downtown Baltimore to reach a broader audience. A 35-million dollar capital campaign, led by the Board of Directors, resulted in the renovation of Downtown's historic Fish Market building, which became the new home to Port Discovery Children's Museum in December 1998. 

The building underwent major renovations in 2019. It added several new exhibits as well as a lunchroom and additional restrooms. The renovation cost $10.5 million.

In February 2022, the museum also functioned as a children's vaccine clinic for COVID-19.

Exhibits
 SkyClimber
 The Port
 Art Showcase - a rotating art exhibits
 BGE Studio Workshop
 PD Presents
 Tangram Wall
 Chessie's Grotto
 Kick It Up!
 Royal Farms Convenience Store and Fill’er Up Station
 Adventure Expeditions
 The Oasis
 Tot Trails
 Over/Under Weaving Wall
 Wonder Widgets
 The Overlook
 Previews, Pop-Ups & Prototypes
 Sensory Wall
 Tiny's Diner
 Wonders of Water (WoW!)
 Harvey M. Meyerhoff Gallery

Awards and accolades
Port Discovery has served over 2.5 million visitors and ranks among the top Children's Museums in the U.S. by Parents Magazine(2015) and Forbes (2012). 

In 2009, Port Discovery received the MetLife Foundation and Association of Children's Museums Promising Practice Award for their partnership with PACT: Helping Children with Special Needs.

In January 2011, Port Discovery was designated as a “Good to Grow Museum” for promoting healthy living for families. They are one of six children's museums out of 350 nationally and internationally to receive this designation. This national recognition comes from the Association of Children's Museums.

References

External links
 
 Port Discovery Children's Museum Photo Gallery

Inner Harbor, Baltimore
Museums in Baltimore
Children's museums in Maryland
1998 establishments in Maryland
Museums established in 1998